Barden is a hamlet and civil parish in the Richmondshire district of North Yorkshire, England. According to the 2001 census the parish had a population of 49, remaining at less than 100 in the 2011 Census. Population information is kept in the parish of Hauxwell.

References

External links
 
 

Hamlets in North Yorkshire
Civil parishes in North Yorkshire